Kong Yun-jin (born 27 September 1981) is a South Korean gymnast. She competed at the 1996 Summer Olympics.

References

External links
 

1981 births
Living people
South Korean female artistic gymnasts
Olympic gymnasts of South Korea
Gymnasts at the 1996 Summer Olympics
Gymnasts from Seoul
20th-century South Korean women